The NAU Lumberjacks are the varsity athletic teams representing Northern Arizona University in Flagstaff, Arizona in intercollegiate athletics. The school's mascot was adopted in 1946. The Lumberjacks compete in NCAA Division I and are full members of the Big Sky Conference with the exception of the women's swimming and diving team which is an affiliate member of the Western Athletic Conference (WAC).

Sports sponsored

Individual teams

Men's Basketball 

The school's team has competed in the Big Sky Conference since 1970. The team's most recent appearance in the NCAA Division I men's basketball tournament was in 2000. The Lumberjacks are currently led by interim head coach Shane Burcar who replaced Jack Murphy.

Women's Basketball 

The team has been coached by Loree Payne since 2017 and last won the Big Sky championship in 2006.

Cross Country 
The team is head coached by Michael Smith. Since 2016, the Northern Arizona men's team is widely considered as the nation's leading program in the NCAA Division I. The team has been constantly ranked in the top 2 nationally of the USTFCCCA coach's poll since the start of the 2017 season. The team has dominated the Big Sky championship, winning 20 of the last 25 Big Sky team championships and 17 of the last 25 Big Sky individual titles as of 2017. The Lumberjacks won the NCAA Men's Division I Cross Country Championship in 2016, 2017, 2018, and 2020. The 2017 repeat title closed out a perfect season with a 53-point victory, placing five athletes in the top 40. The victory was the lowest score (74) at the NCAA Championships since 2014, and the Lumberjacks became the first repeat champions since 2013–14. Director of Cross Country and Track and Field Michael Smith earned the Bill Dellinger Award as National Men's Coach of the Year and also picked up both the Big Sky's Men's and Women's Coach of the Year awards. In track and field, Smith was named the US Track & Field and Cross Country Coaches Association (USTFCCCA) Mountain Region Women's Indoor Coach of the Year in 2017 and 2018.

Football 

The team competes in the NCAA Division I Football Championship Subdivision (FCS). The school's first football team was fielded in 1915. The team plays its home games at the 17,500 seat Walkup Skydome. They are head coached by Chris Ball.

Swimming and Diving 
Northern Arizona competes as an affiliate member of the Western Athletic Conference.
 8× WAC Champions: 2014, 2015, 2016, 2017, 2018, 2019, 2020, 2021

National championships

NCAA team championships
Northern Arizona has won six NCAA D1 team national championships.
 Men's (6)
 Cross country (6): 2016, 2017, 2018, 2020, 2021, 2022
 See also
 List of NCAA schools with the most NCAA Division I championships
 List of Big Sky Conference National Titles

Other national team championships 
Below are 2 national team titles won by club sports teams at the highest collegiate levels in other non-NCAA competition:
 Men's (2)
 Archery (recurve) (1): 2015
 Archery (compound) (1): 2016

Individual national champions

Men

Women 

(i)=indoor track and field event(o)=outdoor track and field event

Club sports

Ice Hockey 

The club hockey team competes in the American Collegiate Hockey Association at the Division II and III levels. The team was formerly in the NCAA Division I from 1981-1986.
 1× Conference Champion: 2013

Team Tennis 
The club tennis team competes in the USTA Tennis on Campus league and won the 2017 Spring Invitational national tournament.

Quidditch
The university also fields a club quidditch team, known as the NAU Narwhals, who compete in US Quidditch. The Narwhals advanced to the Elite 8 at IQA World Cup VI in 2013.

Olympians

References

External links